Watanya Bunnag (born 13 November 1984), also familiarly known as Madam Dear is a Thai female politician and businesswoman.

Early life and education
Watanya (née Wongopasi) graduated from the Faculty of Liberal Arts, Thammasat University. While she was a student, she used to be a cheerleader in the Chula–Thammasat Traditional Football Match.

Careers

Football and business
She is widely known for being the manager of Thailand national under-21 football team and Thailand national under-23 football team.

In addition, she also used to be the president of the News Network Corporation PCL. (Spring News).

Politics
Politically, she was a party-list MP for Palang Pracharat Party from the general election in 2019.

She was the leader of a group called "Constellation", which consists of approximately six MPs in Bangkok.

On August 16, 2022, she resigned from being an MP and a member of the Palang Pracharat Party.

Later, on September 22 of the same year, she ran for a member of the Democrat Party. Watanya was also appointed as a head of the party's political innovation team on Bangkok Metropolitan Region for the general election in 2023.

Family life
Watanya married (officially) to Shine Bunnag, The Nation CEO, in 2022, after 13 years of living together. The couple has two children.

Royal decorations
 2017 -  Knight Commander (Second Class).

References

External links
 

Watanya Bunnag
Watanya Bunnag
Watanya Bunnag
Watanya Bunnag
Living people
1984 births
Watanya Bunnag
Watanya Bunnag
Watanya Bunnag
Watanya Bunnag